Who Is Ghislaine Maxwell? is an 2022 American-British documentary television miniseries revolving around the Ghislaine Maxwell, directed by Erica Gornall. It consisted of 3-episodes and premiered in the United States on June 26, 2022, on Starz, and in the United Kingdom on July 5, 2022, on Channel 4.

Plot
The series follows Ghislaine Maxwell from her early days to her relationship with Jeffrey Epstein, and conviction.

Jeffrey Epstein and Ghislaine Maxwell are in common-law marriage while being in open relationships. The opposing parties claim that the couple were having relationship with girls under the age of 18.

Maria Farmer says that the teenage girls were promised the opportunity to work as Victoria's Secret models.

Episodes

Production
Initially set to be a feature-length film, the project evolved into a three-part series, due to the amount of material. The producers wanted to document Ghislaine Maxwell's entire life, including before and after her association with Jeffrey Epstein.

In February 2021, it was announced Erica Gornall would direct a documentary revolving around Ghislaine Maxwell, with Mike Lerner and Dorothy Byrne set to executive produce, with Channel 4 broadcasting in the United Kingdom. In October 2021, Starz was announced to co-produce the series and distribute in the United States.

Broadcast
In the United Kingdom, the series premiered on July 5, 2022, on Channel 4 as Ghislaine Maxwell: The Making of a Monster.

In Germany, the series aired in full on July 25, 2022, on Das Erste as Wer ist Ghislaine Maxwell?.

Notes

See also
Age of consent#Reforms in the 19th and 20th century

References

External links
 

2022 American television series debuts
2022 American television series endings
2022 British television series debuts
2022 British television series endings
2020s American documentary television series
2020s British documentary television series
2020s American television miniseries
2020s British television miniseries
Channel 4 documentary series
Starz original programming
Films about child sexual abuse
Jeffrey Epstein
Ghislaine Maxwell